Donald P. Ryan (born 1957) is an American archaeologist, Egyptologist, writer and a member of the Division of Humanities at Pacific Lutheran University in Tacoma, Washington.  His areas of research interest include Egyptian archaeology, Polynesian archaeology, the history of archaeology, the history of exploration, ancient languages and scripts and experimental archaeology.  He is best known for his research in Egypt including excavations in the Valley of the Kings where he investigated the long-neglected undecorated tombs in the royal cemetery.  His work there resulted in the rediscovery of the lost and controversial tomb KV60, the re-opening of the long-buried KV21 with its two female and likely royal occupants, and tombs KV27, KV28, KV44, KV45 and KV48.  In 2017, he rediscovered three small tombs (KV50, KV51 and KV52) in the Valley of the Kings which when first encountered in 1906 contained the mummies of animals including a dog and monkeys.

The mummy found within KV60 was identified as that of the female pharaoh Hatshepsut by Zahi Hawass and his Egyptian team in 2007.

Between 1995 and 2002, Ryan worked closely with the Norwegian explorer, archaeologist and writer Thor Heyerdahl (1914-2002).  Among their many projects, the two directed excavations at the site of the Pyramids of Guimar on Tenerife in the Canary Islands.  Ryan has been entrusted with continuing some of the research aspects of Heyerdahl’s legacy.

Other research by Ryan includes investigations of ancient Egyptian cordage and other technologies, studies of inscribed Egyptian funerary cones, 
biographical studies of early archaeologists including Giovanni Belzoni,<ref>1986, "Giovanni Battista Belzoni."Biblical Archaeologist 49(3):133-138; 1995 "David George Hogarth at Asyut, Egypt: 1906-1907: the history of a "lost" excavation." Bulletin of the History of Archaeology 5(2):3-16; 1996, "David George Hogarth: A somewhat reluctant Egyptologist."
KMT: A Modern Journal of Ancient Egypt 7(2):77-81.2004, "The Great Temple revealed: Giovanni Battista Belzoni at Abu Simbel."
KMT 15(2):68-82; 2016 "The very brief Theban excavation of H.S. Whitaker." In, Jacobus Van Dijk, ed., A Mouthful of Dust: Egyptological Studies in Honor of Geoffrey Thorndike Martin''''. Peeters: Leuven.</ref> studies of the influence of antiquity on culture and the arts, and the documentation of petroglyphs on the island of Hawaii.

As a writer and researcher, Ryan is the author of numerous scientific and popular articles on archaeological subjects.  His books include volumes in the popular Complete Idiot’s Guide Series (Lost Civilizations, Biblical Mysteries, Ancient Egypt and World of the Bible), A Shattered Visage Lies...Nineteenth Century Poetry Inspired By Ancient Egypt, Ancient Egypt on Five Deben a Day, Ancient Egypt: The Basics, Ancient Egypt in Verse, and a memoir, Beneath the Sands of Egypt.  He was a major contributor to Thor Heyerdahl's Kon-Tiki in New Light and wrote the introduction to the new Norwegian edition of Heyerdahl's "Kon-Tiki".  His television credits include "The Face of Tutankhamun" (BBC-Television/A&E), "Biography: Howard Carter" (A&E), "Great Builders of Egypt" (A&E), "Missing Mummies" (Learning Channel), "Ancient Mysteries of the World: Easter Island" (PAX Network),"Secrets of Egypt's Lost Queen" (Discovery Channel), Nordisk Film,"På jakt etter paradiset." (advisor), "Terra X: Thor Heyerdahl (Zweites Deutsches Fernsehen), "Unearthed: Tut's Buried Secrets." (Science Channel).

Ryan is a Fellow of The Explorers Club and the Royal Geographical Society, a Research Associate of the Kon-Tiki Museum, a founding member of the Scientific Committee of the Foundation for Exploration and Research on Cultural Origins'', a mountaineering instructor, long-distance runner, and pianist.

References

External links
Donald P. Ryan Web-Page
Ryan's Egyptian Archaeology Page
Ryan's Polynesian Archaeology Page including work with Thor Heyerdahl

American archaeologists
Fellows of the Royal Geographical Society
Pacific Lutheran University faculty
1957 births
Living people
American Egyptologists